New Beginning of Girls' Generation is the second music DVD release from South Korean girl group Girls' Generation. It was released on August 11, 2010 in Japan.

History
The DVD was released, both the Regular and Limited Editions. The DVD contains the music videos of Genie, Gee, Oh, Run Devil Run, Into the New World, Girls’ Generation, and Kissing You, and a special video only in this package. The First Press Limited Edition contains, along with the DVD,  the invitation for 2 to their Japanese Showcase at Tokyo’s Ariake Coliseum on August 25, as well as  includes a pass and a glow stick.

Track list

Charts

Sales and certifications

Release history

References

External links
 Girls' Generation – Official Korean website

2010 video albums
Girls' Generation video albums
SM Entertainment video albums
Electropop video albums